Chandrashekhar Atram (born 1 October 1983) is an Indian cricketer. He played 32 first-class and 24 List A matches between 1999 and 2006. He was also part of India's squad for the 2002 Under-19 Cricket World Cup.

References

External links
 

1983 births
Living people
Indian cricketers
Vidarbha cricketers
People from Wardha